Sadhu Singh is an Indian academic and politician from Punjab. He was a member of parliament from Faridkot from 2014 to 2019. He is part of the Aam Aadmi Party and is a member of its national executive committee.

Early life and education 
Sadhu Singh was born in the village of Manuke Gill in Moga District in 1941. He joined the irrigation department as a draughtsman in Chandigarh in 1961. He continued his studies and was awarded a M.A. degree in English from Punjab University, Chandigarh in 1970. He also attained degree of Budhiman (Proficiency in Punjabi) from Panjab University in Chandhigarh. He also taught the subject of English to paramedical classes at Baba Farid University of Health Sciences, Faridkot.

Career 
He was selected by Punjab Public Service Commission as a college lecturer in English in 1970. He served at Government Brijindra College Faridkot from 1971 to 1999 as Lecturer in English and worked for College Lecturer Association (G.C.L.A.) Punjab. After retirement in 1999, he worked as Principal in K. K. Marwah Girls College, Faridkot.

Publication 
Singh has authored two books of Punjabi poetry, Pyasi Mehak and Saleeb Te Sargam and has been associated with numerous literary and cultural Sabhas and Kendri Punjabi Lekhak Sabha.

Politics 
Singh contested the 2014 Indian general election on an Aam Aadmi Party ticket from Faridkot constituency and defeated Shiromani Akali Dal's Paramjit Kaur Gulshan by 172,516 votes.

See also 
 2017 Punjab Legislative Assembly election

References

 

India MPs 2014–2019
Aam Aadmi Party politicians from Punjab, India
Living people
Lok Sabha members from Punjab, India
1941 births
People from Moga district
People from Faridkot, Punjab